Wire-haired may refer to a number of dog breeds with a harsh, wiry coat:

 German Wirehaired Pointer
 Istrian Coarse-haired Hound, also known as the Wirehaired Istrian Hound
 Styrian Coarse-haired Hound, also known as the Wirehair Styrian Mountain
 Wire Fox Terrier
 Wire-haired Dachshund
 Wirehaired Pointing Griffon
 Wirehaired Vizsla